Niklaus Emil Wirth (born 15 February 1934) is a Swiss computer scientist. He has designed several programming languages, including Pascal, and pioneered several classic topics in software engineering. In 1984, he won the Turing Award, generally recognized as the highest distinction in computer science, for developing a sequence of innovative computer languages.

Biography
Wirth was born in Winterthur, Switzerland, in 1934. In 1959, he earned a Bachelor of Science (B.S.) degree in electronic engineering from the Swiss Federal Institute of Technology Zürich (ETH Zürich). In 1960, he earned a Master of Science (MSc) from Université Laval, Canada. Then in 1963, he was awarded a PhD in Electrical Engineering and Computer Science (EECS) from the University of California, Berkeley, supervised by the computer design pioneer Harry Huskey.

From 1963 to 1967, he served as assistant professor of computer science at Stanford University and again at the University of Zurich. Then in 1968, he became Professor of Informatics at ETH Zürich, taking two one-year sabbaticals at Xerox PARC in California (1976–1977 and 1984–1985). He retired in 1999.

He was involved with developing international standards in programming and informatics, as a member of the International Federation for Information Processing (IFIP) IFIP Working Group 2.1 on Algorithmic Languages and Calculi, which specified, maintains, and supports the programming languages ALGOL 60 and ALGOL 68.

In 2004, he was made a Fellow of the Computer History Museum "for seminal work in programming languages and algorithms, including Euler, Algol-W, Pascal, Modula, and Oberon."

Programming languages

Wirth was the chief designer of the programming languages Euler (1965), PL360 (1966), ALGOL W (1966), Pascal (1970), Modula (1975), Modula-2 (1978), Oberon (1987), Oberon-2 (1991), and Oberon-07 (2007). He was also a major part of the design and implementation team for the operating systems Medos-2 (1983, for the Lilith workstation), and Oberon (1987, for the Ceres workstation), and for the Lola (1995) digital hardware design and simulation system. In 1984, he received the Association for Computing Machinery (ACM) Turing Award for the development of these languages. In 1994, he was inducted as a Fellow of the ACM.

Publications
His book, written jointly with Kathleen Jensen, The Pascal User Manual and Report, served as the basis of many language implementation efforts in the 1970s and 1980s in the United States and across Europe.

His article Program Development by Stepwise Refinement, about the teaching of programming, is considered to be a classic text in software engineering. In 1975, he wrote the book Algorithms + Data Structures = Programs, which gained wide recognition. Major revisions of this book with the new title Algorithms + Data Structures were published in 1985 and 2004. The examples in the first edition were written in Pascal. These were replaced in the later editions with examples written in Modula-2 and Oberon respectively.

His textbook, Systematic Programming: An Introduction, was considered a good source for students who wanted to do more than just coding. The cover flap of the sixth edition (1973) stated the book "... is tailored to the needs of people who view a course on systematic construction of algorithms as part of their basic mathematical training, rather than to the immediate needs of those who wish to be able to occasionally encode a problem and hand it over to their computer for instant solution." Regarded as a challenging text to work through, it was sought as imperative reading for those interested in numerical mathematics.

In 1992, he and Jürg Gutknecht published the full documentation of the Oberon OS. A second book, with Martin Reiser, was intended as a programming guide.

Wirth's law

In 1995, he popularized the adage now named Wirth's law, which states that software is getting slower more rapidly than hardware becomes faster. In his 1995 paper A Plea for Lean Software he attributes it to Martin Reiser.

See also
21655 Niklauswirth asteroid
Extended Backus–Naur form
Wirth syntax notation
Bucky bit
Wirth–Weber precedence relationship
List of pioneers in computer science

References

External links

, ETH Zürich
Biography at ETH Zürich

Niklaus E. Wirth at ACM

Turing Award Lecture, 1984
Pascal and its Successors paper by Niklaus Wirth – also includes short biography.
A Few Words with Niklaus Wirth
The School of Niklaus Wirth: The Art of Simplicity, by László Böszörményi, Jürg Gutknecht, Gustav Pomberger (editors). dpunkt.verlag; Morgan Kaufmann Publishers, 2000. , .
The book Compiler Construction
The book Algorithms and Data Structures
The book Project Oberon – The Design of an Operating System and Compiler. The book about the Oberon language and Operating System is now available as a PDF file. The PDF file has an additional appendix Ten Years After: From Objects to Components.
Project Oberon 2013

1934 births
Living people
ETH Zurich alumni
Academic staff of ETH Zurich
Swiss electronics engineers
Fellows of the Association for Computing Machinery
Formal methods people
Pascal (programming language)
Programming language designers
Programming language researchers
Recipients of the Pour le Mérite (civil class)
Swiss computer scientists
Turing Award laureates
Université Laval alumni
People from Winterthur
Computer science educators
Scientists at PARC (company)
UC Berkeley College of Engineering alumni